Dave Spina (born June 5, 1983) is an American retired professional ice hockey right winger.

On August 26, 2010, Spina signed a one-year contract with St. Louis Blues.
Spina played the  2010–11 with the Peoria Rivermen of the American Hockey League. He has played over 300 regular-season games in the AHL also with the Utah Grizzlies, Springfield Falcons, and San Antonio Rampage.

After parts of two season's in the Finnish Liiga with SaiPa leading the club in scoring with 44 points in 56 games during the 2014–15 season, Spina left out of contract and signed a two-year deal with rivals HC TPS on March 31, 2015.

Career statistics

Regular season and Playoffs

International

Awards and honors

References

External links

1983 births
Living people
American men's ice hockey right wingers
Boston College Eagles men's ice hockey players
Ice hockey players from Illinois
Iserlohn Roosters players
Johnstown Chiefs players
Modo Hockey players
Peoria Rivermen (AHL) players
San Antonio Rampage players
South Carolina Stingrays players
Springfield Falcons players
SaiPa players
Sportspeople from Springfield, Illinois
Texas Tornado players
HC TPS players
USA Hockey National Team Development Program players
Utah Grizzlies (AHL) players